Suzi Godson is The Times sex and relationships columnist.

Born in Ireland, she moved to London aged 18 to study graphic design at Saint Martin's School of Art and the Royal College of Art. She subsequently acquired an Msc and a PhD in psychology at Birkbeck, University of London. In 2001, Godson launched the UK's first broadsheet sex column in The Independent On Sunday. She moved to The Times in 2004 and continues to write a weekly column answering questions about sex and relationships. Godson's Times column is syndicated to the Irish Examiner. Godson is the author of The Sex Book[1] [2](Cassell), The Body Bible[3] (Penguin) and Sex Counsel[4] (Cassell). In 2017, she launched Tellmi, a multi-award winning, anonymous, pre-moderated, peer support app for young people aged 11-25. Tellmi is NHS commissioned and has been independently evidenced to improve mental health in young people. Suzi is married and has four children. Her youngest daughter has type one diabetes[5].

References

 "Mother of three turned sex guru". 2002-05-27. Retrieved 2016-08-20.
 Freely, Maureen (2002-05-25). "Please yourself - and everyone else". The Guardian. ISSN 0261-3077. Retrieved 2016-08-20.
 "Body bible: the answer to women's prayers" The Times. Retrieved 2016-08-20.
 "A Little Bit Bookish!: Sex Counsel - Suzi Godson". chaoskay.blogspot.co.uk. Retrieved 2016-08-20.
 "Coping with a child who has diabetes" The Times. Retrieved 2016-08-20.

Living people
The Times journalists
Year of birth missing (living people)